New York's 53rd State Senate district is one of 63 districts in the New York State Senate. It has been represented by Democrat Rachel May since 2019, following her defeat of IDC-aligned incumbent David Valesky in the 2018 primary election.

Geography
District 53 is based around the city of Syracuse in Onondaga County, and stretches to cover all of Madison County and parts of Oneida County in Central New York.

The district overlaps with New York's 19th and 22nd congressional districts, and with the 117th, 121st, 126th, 127th, 128th, and 129th districts of the New York State Assembly.

Recent election results

2020

2018

2016

2014

2012

Federal results in District 53

References

53